Leiodes ciliaris  is a species of fungus beetle in the Leiodidae family.

References

Leiodidae
Beetles described in 1841